Huilong Yi Ethnic Township is a township of Shimian County in western Sichuan province, China, located  southeast of the county seat as the crow flies along China National Highway 108. , it has six villages under its administration.

See also 
 List of township-level divisions of Sichuan

References 

Township-level divisions of Sichuan
Yi ethnic townships
Ya'an